Monopoly Streets is a video game based on the board game of the same name, and one of many in the Monopoly video game series. Developed by EA Salt Lake and published by Electronic Arts, the game was released on the PlayStation 3, Xbox 360, and Wii on October 26, 2010.

Development 

The game was released to celebrate the 75th anniversary of the Monopoly board game.

Gameplay 

The gameplay at its core is not too dissimilar from the original board game it was based on, but the board is presentated as a living, breathing city, with there being pictural illustrations of each of the properties being constructed as they are bought, with designs based on the economic status of the surrounding area. Elements such as auctions are done with streamlined and automated systems. Achievements can be unlocked for the player to gain access to new pieces and boards.

Critical reception 

The game received a Metacritic rating of 64% (PlayStation 3), 66% (Xbox 360), and 65% (Wii). Meanwhile, the game received a GameRankings rating of 64.11% (PlayStation 3), 67.22% (Xbox 360), and 64.29% (Wii).

IGN reviewer Colin Moriarty scored the PlayStation 3 and Xbox 360 versions a 7.5, but scored the Wii version a full point lower due to the lack of "online functionality".

References

External links 
 (archived)

2010 video games
Electronic Arts games
Monopoly video games
PlayStation 3 games
Wii games
Xbox 360 games
Video games developed in the United States